35 The Shambles is an historic building in the English city of York, North Yorkshire. A Grade II* listed building, part of the structure dates to the mid-14th century, with an extension added the following century. The ground floor was rebuilt in variegated brick in Flemish bond; the two upper levels are rendered.

The building contains a priest-hole fireplace.

St Margaret Clitherow 
On the ground floor is a shrine to St Margaret Clitherow, who was married to a butcher who owned and lived in a shop in the street. Her home is thought to have been No. 10 Shambles, on the opposite side of the street to the shrine.

References 

35
Houses in North Yorkshire
Buildings and structures in North Yorkshire
14th-century establishments in England
Grade II* listed buildings in York
Grade II* listed houses
14th century in York